Cyril Guyot (born 4 January 1980) is a French professional football player. Currently, he plays in the Championnat de France amateur for FC Dieppe.

He played on the professional level in Ligue 2 for Le Havre AC.

1980 births
Living people
French footballers
Ligue 2 players
Le Havre AC players
Louhans-Cuiseaux FC players
AS Cannes players
Pau FC players
Les Herbiers VF players
FC Dieppe players
Footballers from Normandy
Association football defenders
Sportspeople from Seine-Maritime
Mediterranean Games bronze medalists for France
Mediterranean Games medalists in football
Competitors at the 2001 Mediterranean Games